Clatt may refer to:

 Clatt, village in Aberdeenshire, Scotland
 Clatt Primary School,  primary school in Clatt
 Corwin Clatt (1924–1997), American football player